Rik Pinxten (born 12 March 1947 in Antwerp) is a professor and researcher in cultural anthropology at Ghent University. Between 2003 and 2010 he was chairman of the Liberal Humanist Association of Flanders, the Flemish section of The Humanist Association (Belgium). He is chairman of the Center for Intercultural Communication and Interaction (CICI) of the University of Ghent. Together with Gerard Mortier, he was an advocate for the creation of the progressive Music Forum "The Krook" in Ghent. In 2004, he received the Ark Prize of the Free Word for his book The Artistic Society.

Pinxten conducted his fieldwork with the Navajo people.  He is an advocate for interculturalism over multiculturalism, arguing for dialogue and interaction between different communities based on a strong identity.

Bibliography
2009 DIY democracy, Ghislain Verstraete, eds, EPO, 
2009 People. An introduction to cultural anthropology, Lannoo, 
2007 The stripes of the zebra: a militant secular humanism, Houtekiet, 
2007 The great transition: conversations between a doctor and an anthropologist without believing God, Lannoo, 
2006 The Cultural century Houtekiet, 
2003 The artistic community: the influence of art on democracy, Houtekiet, 
2000 Divine fantasy about religion, learning and identity, Houtekiet, 
2006 Racism in Metropolitan Areas
1999 Cultures die slowly: on intercultural communication, Houtekiet, 
1998 Culture and power: on identity and conflict in a multicultural world - including Ed Rik Pinxten ... [Et al], Houtekiet, 
1997 Culture in Comparative Perspective - by Ed Rik Pinxten ... [Et al], Flemish Association for Cultural Studies, 
1993 Give to Caesar ... : About religion and politics - having edited by Pinxten, Rik, Kritak, 
Initiations 1986, death - ed Pinxten, R., Communication and Cognition,

References

External links
Centre for Intercultural Communication and Interaction at Ghent University

Pinxten
Pinxten
1947 births
Living people